are the orthographic rules for spelling Japanese in kana. All phonographic systems (of which kana is an example) attempt to account accurately the pronunciation in their spellings. However, pronunciation and accents change over time and phonemic distinctions are often lost. Various systems of kanazukai were introduced to deal with the disparity between the written and spoken versions of Japanese.

Historical systems
The former mainstream kana usage, or the Kyū-Kanazukai (‘old kana usage’), is based on classical texts, especially man'yōgana. Created by Keichū in the early Edo period, it is also known as the Keichū Kanazukai. It was the mainstream kanazukai until the Gendai Kanazukai was introduced in 1946.

There were other minor systems throughout history that are now defunct:
 Jōdai Tokushu Kanazukai: a modified Man'yōgana where /e, je/ are distinct.
 Teika Kanazukai: created by Fujiwara no Teika, it distinguishes between /wo, o/, /i, hi, wi/, /e, we, he/, and also (to a lesser degree) /e, je/. /wo, o/ were used to express high and low accent, respectively.
 Gyōa Kanazukai (Kanamojizukai): created by Minamoto no Chikayuki and Gyōa, which expanded on the Teika Kanazukai by distinguishing between /ho/, /wa, ha/, /u, hu/, and /mu/. /wo, o/ are still used to distinguish between high and low accent. However, the distinction between /e, je/ is obliterated.

Gendai Kanazukai

Derived from the Kyū-Kanazukai, gendai kanazukai is a revision to more approximate modern pronunciation that is still used currently. As an adaption of the Kyū-Kanazukai, it is still not entirely phonetic, especially in respect to long vowels and particles.

References

See also
 Yotsugana

Japanese writing system
Kana
Archaic Japanese language
Japanese orthography
Spelling reform